Iisaku is a small borough in northeastern Estonia. It is located in Ida-Viru county in Alutaguse Parish, around 30 km south from the town of Jõhvi. Iisaku was the administrative centre of Iisaku Parish. As of 2011 Census, the settlement's population was 761, of which the Estonians were 717 (94.2%).

References

Boroughs and small boroughs in Estonia
Kreis Wierland